Judge (or street judge) is a title held by several significant characters in Judge Dredd and other series which appear in the British comics 2000 AD and Judge Dredd Megazine. In the fictional future history of the series, the role of "Judge" combines those of judge, jury and police officer, thus avoiding long legal wrangles by allowing for criminals to be tried and sentenced on the spot. Since they overthrew the U.S. Constitution in 2070, Judges have also held supreme political power in Mega-City One. Collectively they are known as the Justice Department.

Overview
In the comic strip, Judges are the product of many (normally 15) years' of training and psychological conditioning. Training, which takes place in the Academy of Law, generally begins at age five. The Judges recruit promising children, and grow their own clones. Judge Dredd is himself a clone of the Judges' founder, Chief Judge Fargo.

Their standard issue firearm is the Lawgiver handgun, which can fire six different kinds of ammunition. It has a handprint-reading sensor which only allows its owner to use it, and a self-destruct device to kill or maim unauthorised users. Judges ride Lawmaster bikes, which are heavily armed and have artificial intelligence.

The Judges themselves are not above the law – a violation that would earn a citizen a few months in an Iso[lation]-Cube may earn a Judge a twenty-year sentence of hard labour on Saturn's moon, Titan, after surgical modification to enable the convict to survive Titan's atmosphere. They were also expected to live in celibacy, to avoid personal attachments that might bias them or make them vulnerable to manipulation and blackmail.

For most of the strip's history, the Judges are led by a Chief Judge and a Council of Five. The Judges have their own domestic intelligence division (the Public Surveillance Unit), and their own medical facilities. There are a number of specialist divisions within the Judges, notably Psi Division, which consists of psychic judges used to predict the future and read minds, and Tek Division, made of forensic scientists and engineers. The SJS (Special Judicial Squad) monitors and polices the Judges internally.

The majority of Judges reside and spend their limited free time in their sector houses. However, they have the right to own personal property or live in private residences. Dredd himself for much of the early years lived in an apartment in Rowdy Yates block and upon moving out was shown to have kept mementoes of his early career.

In the Judge Dredd future history, the Judge System originated in the United States (see History of Mega-City One), but spread around the world. In most of these nations the Judges control all aspects of the government but differ in customs. The Judges of Ireland, for example, are allowed to drink and smoke, or be married, whereas MC-1 Judges have virtually no private life. Corruption is endemic amongst the Judges of Brit-Cit, and bribery is often essential to progress through the ranks.

Block Judges (Judges assigned to a particular city block) also hear civil cases in each City Block, where they try compensation claims, libel, slander, divorce, alimony, and small claims matters.

Notable Judges appearing in the series include Anderson (of Psi Division), Hershey, Kraken, two different Judge Giants, and the eponymous Judge Dredd himself.

Divisions/Bodies

Within the Mega-City One legal system there are numerous bodies and divisions that have specialised tasks:

 Street Division (normal Judges)
 Riot squads
 H-Wagon crews (aerial units)
 Heavies/Manta Tank crews (artillery)
 Vice
 Academy of Law
 Psi Division (judges with psychic powers, encompassing Exorcist Judges and the Department of Magic)
 Special Judicial Squad or SJS (internal affairs)
 Tek Division, a.k.a. Technical Division (scientists)
 "Wally Squad" (Undercover Division)
 Space Corps
 Public Surveillance Unit (PSU)
 Black Ops
 Defence Division (army)
 Public Relations Division
 Accounts
 Diplomatic 
 Traffic
 Med Division
 Fire Division
 Meat Wagons (corpse disposal, often using civilian auxiliaries)
 Township deputies (mutant deputies drafted to police Cursed Earth townships)
 Holocaust Squad (teams of disgraced Judges who undertake suicide missions at times of extreme peril to Mega-City One)

In 2134, there was an across-the-board divisional merger, creating:

 Street Division: absorbing Meat Wagon, H-Wagon, Riot, and Sniper divisions
 Undercover Operations Division: newly created and encompassing SJS, Black Ops, Wally Squad, and PSU.

Training

Before becoming fully-fledged street judges, cadet judges usually must spend 15 years (but in exceptional circumstances, some have graduated quicker) at the Academy of Law, where they receive intensive training and conditioning.

A cadet is inducted into the Academy either as a cloned infant (as does Judge Dredd), or as a child aged five (although older children have been recruited). After this, unsupervised contact with the city outside is forbidden, in order to maintain the strictest discipline and mental conditioning.

Cadet Judges must leave both the Academy and the city itself during their "Hotdog Run": a training mission into the Cursed Earth, to test the cadets under combat conditions and fatalities are not uncommon. A senior Judge will command and assess the cadets during the Hotdog Run.

On graduating from the Academy, cadets become known as rookie judges. A rookie's uniform is similar to that of a full judge, with two differences: the helmet is white rather than black and red, and the badge consists of only one half of a full judge's badge and does not show the rookie's name (this design is sometimes varied by artists; see illustration, right). (Note however that some artists have wrongly depicted cadets in rookies' uniforms, and rookies in full judges' uniforms).

Before becoming a full judge, a rookie must undergo assessment by a more experienced Senior Judge. The failure rate is extremely high, and the few who pass their final assessment exchange their white helmet and "half-eagle" for the black and red helmet and "full eagle" at a brief ceremony before the chief judge.

Notable characters seen taking their final assessments are the original Judge Giant, the other Judge Giant, Judge Rico, Judge Kraken, and Dredd himself (in flashbacks). The 2012 film Dredd depicts Judge Anderson's final assessment.

Cadets who fail to graduate are expelled from the Academy. Rookies who fail their final assessment earlier had no right of appeal, but this is no longer the case. Failed cadets and rookies are either employed as auxiliaries or leave the Justice Department altogether.

Ever since the Day Of Chaos storyline, the department has taken on retrainees; judges transferred from other megacities to bolster their ranks.

Retirement

When a street judge retires from service at the end of his career, he may choose to take the "Long Walk," leaving Mega-City One for exile outside its borders. He may do this either in the Cursed Earth, a radioactive desert outside the city walls, or in the Undercity, the ruins of New York that lie beneath the mega-city. The Long Walk begins with a brief ceremony at the city gates, wherein the retiring judge walks through an honour guard of judges as they discharge their firearms into the air, while another judge formally bids him farewell. Judges who take the Long Walk are expected never to return, but to die "bringing law to the lawless."

Retiring judges may also be placed in administrative or teaching posts instead of taking the Long Walk. Some are sent to specialist care homes, such as the Institute For Troubled Psychics, if they are deemed to be too unwell or dangerous to be allowed back freely among the civilian population. Others may simply leave and voluntarily become ordinary citizens, having grown tired of the strict life of a judge, although such cases are rare. However, the Long Walk is often chosen by judges who have been subject to disciplinary proceedings for misconduct not warranting criminal prosecution. Despite their effective exile, Cursed Earth judges can be called up by active street judges on missions in the Cursed Earth for assistance, once they have discharged their duties to the city, the retired judge is still forbidden from returning to Mega-City One.

Cursed Earth judges are essentially vigilantes. Although they are expected to uphold the same standards of behaviour as street judges, they receive no supervision or support from the city. As such, some of them openly flout the code of practice that street judges must obey- drinking, smoking, or breaking celibacy for example. Also, due to the inevitable wear and tear of their equipment, coupled with their inability to obtain replacements, Cursed Earth judges who have been operating for years may have been forced to discard their uniform and possibly even their lawgiver, making them all but unrecognisable as judges. Cursed Earth judges also act as travelling magistrates, holding makeshift small-claims courts in the various settlements around the wasteland; for these, the arrival of a judge is a rare and exciting event, akin to a carnival, and therefore, along with legitimate grievances, some villagers file frivolous or ridiculous cases for entertainment value.

The Long Walk was introduced in 2000 AD #147, in the 1980 story "Judge Minty," written by John Wagner. In the 1995 feature film, the Long Walk is mandatory for all Judges upon retirement.

Notable exceptions
Two exceptions of judges returning to active duty after taking the Long Walk were Chief Judge McGruder and Judge Dredd himself:

 Chief Judge McGruder resigned in 2108 when she blamed herself for an error of judgment (see Shojun the Warlord) which cost hundreds of lives. Dredd presided over her Long Walk ceremony.
 Dredd took the Long Walk in 2112, after succumbing to doubts regarding the ethics of the Judge System, brought to a head after he received a posthumous letter from William Wenders, a child killed as an indirect result of the Judges' suppression of the Democratic March. In the Cursed Earth, Dredd learned about the catastrophe known as Necropolis, and returned to Mega-City One to defeat the Dark Judges, recruiting McGruder along the way. Thus, Dredd and McGruder were the first judges ever to return to the city after taking the Long Walk. This later became the focus of former Chief Judge Silver's legal challenge to McGruder's return to the office, as Silver insisted that McGruder was disqualified from being chief judge as "Judges don't go back". Silver did not object to Dredd adjudicating between them even though Dredd had also returned from the Long Walk.

After the Justice Department's strength was reduced during Judgment Day, Necropolis, and the Second Robot War, a street judge position was offered to Judge Prager – who had survived over 20 years in the Undercity – even though he was infected with lycanthropy, making him a werewolf. He declined and returned to the Undercity after stocking up on supplies.

In the 1995 film, Chief Judge Fargo (played by Max von Sydow) steps down, using his last request to save Dredd from execution. He takes the Long Walk into the Cursed Earth and is later killed by Mean Machine Angel. (The 2000 AD comic strip version of this character never took the Long Walk.)

History

The Judge System was created by Eustace Fargo, special government prosecutor for street crime, between 2027 and 2031, to combat a rising tide of violent crime and to speed up the process of justice. While there was heavy protest in Congress over the idea of abandoning due process, the electorate was in favour and President Gurney (who supported Fargo's plan) was re-elected with a massive majority. The original uniforms heavily resembled those of normal American police officers, albeit with helmets and heavy body armour, and rode Lawranger motorcycles.

Following the Third World War of 2070 and discovering that President Booth had stolen the election, the Judges invoked "the oldest law of them all" (the Declaration of Independence), overthrowing the Government of the United States and seizing power, with popular support, and the chief judge became the country's ruler. The Judicial model has subsequently spread throughout the globe becoming the most common form of government on Earth by the 22nd century.

Chief Judge

Office and powers
Until 2117 the chief judge was the ex officio chairman of the Council of Five, which in 2070 had become the highest legislative body. He presided over the Council's meetings and could veto any decision with which he disagreed. He could also appoint and dismiss councillors at will. The Council usually included a deputy chief judge, who would automatically succeed to the highest office in the event of the death of the chief judge. (This occurred when Chief Judge Goodman died and was succeeded by his deputy, Judge Cal.) If there was no deputy then the remaining members of the Council elected a new chief judge from among themselves. (Judge Silver was chosen in this way.)

Unfortunately, in Mega-City One's history, there have been occasions when chief judges have abused their considerable power. When Chief Judge McGruder suspended the Council of Five in 2112 and ruled alone there was no mechanism for legally removing her from office when her mental health deteriorated and her decisions became increasingly erratic. She eventually resigned of her own accord in 2116, but by this time the undesirability of vesting too much authority in one individual had become apparent even to the hardline right-wing Judges of Mega-City One.

Therefore, in 2117 three significant changes were made to the system by her new successor, Chief Judge Volt. Firstly, he reformed the Council of Five by removing the chief judge from the Council (although it is not clear how their respective powers are divided between the chief judge and the Council, and the chief judge may still attend Council meetings). Since then the deputy chief judge has chaired most meetings of the Council of Five (the first to do so was DCJ Herriman.) The appointment of a deputy chief judge must have the consent of the Council. This has given some measure of independence to the Council in its deliberations, and provided a constitutional method by which an incapable chief judge can be lawfully removed from office.

Secondly, the law was changed to make chief judges elected by the 400 Senior Judges of the city, rather than by the Council alone. This innovation had first been introduced ad hoc by McGruder herself in 2116, since there was neither a council nor a deputy chief judge during her term of office. It was unpopular with many judges at the time, but Volt made it a permanent rule. This second reform was deemed necessary because McGruder's own succession to the job in 2112 – without any vote being undertaken – had later been challenged as unconstitutional by her predecessor in that office, Judge Silver, resulting in a constitutional crisis. By making this second reform Volt ensured that future chief judges should not have their authority doubted, while at the same time his first reform made the chief judge accountable in the exercise of that authority.

Thirdly, the deputy chief judge is no longer guaranteed the automatic right of succession to the top job. Under the new system, the deputy only becomes acting chief judge in the event of a vacancy in the highest office, and only becomes chief judge in their own right if subsequently elected. This procedure was first invoked when Volt himself died and Deputy Chief Judge Hershey became acting chief judge in 2121, winning the second election to chief judge in 2122. Even this rule only applies to a deputy chief judge who was appointed by an elected chief judge. A deputy chief judge appointed by an unelected chief judge does not become acting chief judge; instead, there must be an election.

Removal from office
Until 2117 the only way in which a chief judge could lawfully be removed from office against his will was by a vote of the Council of Five. This never happened, and it became impossible when Chief Judge McGruder suspended the Council.

Since the constitutional reforms, it has also been possible for a candidate to run against a serving chief judge if one-third of the city's senior judges sign a petition calling for a recall election. By 2131 the number of senior judges had tripled to around 1,200. In that year, senior judges began a successful campaign to vote reformer Chief Judge Hershey out of office, and replace her with hardliner Judge Francisco.

Francisco himself was removed from office in 2132 by his corrupt deputy, Judge Sinfield, who brainwashed him with an illegal mind-altering drug to make him resign so Sinfield could take his place. However, Sinfield discovered that even the chief judge is not above the law, when his crime was discovered and he was arrested. The Council of Five reinstated Francisco.

Other chief judges have ended their term of office either by death or by resignation. Solomon, McGruder, and Francisco resigned (McGruder and Francisco twice); Hershey resigned after serving a second term. Goodman, Cal and Griffin were assassinated. Volt committed suicide (but the public were informed that he had died heroically in the line of duty). Silver attempted suicide and was later executed for dereliction of duty in wartime. Fargo resigned and then attempted suicide, but this was covered up and the public were told he had been killed in the line of duty.

On three occasions the position has been usurped (and one other attempt has been made). In 2101 the insane Judge Cal murdered Judge Goodman to succeed to his office but was killed six months later after a reign of terror. In 2112 Judge Death used the mind control powers of the Sisters of Death to seize control of the Judges and was de facto chief judge during the Necropolis period. In 2115 former Judge Grice attempted a coup but McGruder was soon restored, and as mentioned above in 2132 Judge Sinfield resorted to mind control to gain the top office.

Mental state of Judges

The Judges world wide are shown to have a large superiority complex. This is mainly due to their training making them both physically and often mentally stronger than the average citizens they police. In the academy they are frequently told that they have been given the greatest honour the city can bestow and so they are the elite and have the power of life and death should they want to use it. With this stress is high and, though dwarfed by street violence, death by suicide is common. Most common reasons are demotion (even minor), perceived loss of honour, high stress of the job (future shock syndrome) and forced retirement or desk duty. Three chief judges have attempted suicide (though only one succeeded), and many other notable judges have died that way.

Foreign variations

Every Mega-City seen is policed and run (either completely or partially) by a Judge system, which more or less resembles that of Mega-City One. Variations exist on the uniforms and overall system of government:

 Some Judge systems, such as the Irish (Murphyville) and Australian (Sydney-Melbourne Conurb) ones, have far more lenient and relaxed laws and codes of practice for Judges. Conversely, East-Meg Two (USSR) has a far more militarised and oppressive law, while Japan's Hondo City has a more disciplined and stoic culture among the Judges. Casablancan Judges operate under Sufi-based law.
 Several systems are openly corrupt and serve the ruling figures – Ciudad Barranquilla is traditionally the main example, and the Mafia become the Judges in Las Vegas.
 The remit of the Judges may be different – the Pan-African Judges are an intra-continental peacekeeping force.
 Japan still retains the Shogun as constitutional monarch; the Vatican's Judges (and the city itself) are still answerable to the Pope and senior priests, and Scotland's Cal-Hab Judges are a subordinate branch of Brit-Cit.
 Lunar colony Luna-1 traditionally gained many of its Judges from foreign Mega-Cities, and until 2099 the position of Judge Marshal was replaced every six months and held by a senior Earth Judge. It finally gained a mostly domestic Judge system solely because, following cataclysms like Judgement Day, the Earth cities could not afford to send any Judges.
 Brit-Cit's Justice Department has much of its internal work done by Administrators, who do not have judicial powers; in other Mega-Cities, almost every worker is a Judge (including accountants).
 The Judicial forces of Brit-Cit, Murphyville, and Sino-Cit allow Judges to marry, have children, and have some form of civilian life. Many other Mega-Cities stick with a monastic code, especially MC-1.
 Some Judges deliberately pattern their uniforms after their country's flag.

Places that lack a Judge force include the Mediterranean Free State, Mongolian Exclusion Zone, Canadia (Canada), and the Web (Borneo and Indonesian islands). In some cases, this is a deliberate choice; in others, such as the Web, it is because they cannot afford it.

The foreign Judge stories and spin-off strips have been criticised for relying too much on foreign stereotypes and clichés – Egypt's Judges are based on Ancient Egyptians, the South American Judges are corrupt and incompetent and speak in exaggerated accents, Japanese Judges are samurai figures, etc. Dredd writer Gordon Rennie once wrote a list of foreign stereotypes used in 2000 AD and said "follow them closely, and you're probably in with a chance of pitching a Foreign Judge story to the Megazine circa 1993".

Dark Judges
The Dark Judges are undead creatures from an alternative reality ("Deadworld"), who argue that because all crime is committed by the living, life is a crime and the punishment is death. Their leader, Judge Death, is Judge Dredd's arch-enemy.

Before its extermination, Deadworld was ruled by a murderous and corrupt Judge force; their uniforms were a grey, black, and dark-red variation of Mega-City One's, with pterodactyls in place of eagles as decoration. There does not appear to have been an Atomic War in this world, as the cities shown resembled run-down 20th Century cities rather than the Mega-Cities. The Dark Judges took control of this Judge force and used it to assist them in their global genocide before disposing of it.

Judges

Chief judges

 Judge Fargo (2031–2051)
 Judge Solomon (2051–2057)
 Judge Goodman (2057–2101)
 Judge Cal (2101) (Insane; usurped office by assassinating Goodman).
 Judge Griffin (2101–2104)
 Judge McGruder (2104–2108)
 Judge Silver (2108–2112)
 Judge Death (2112) (Usurper)
 Judge McGruder (2112–2116)
 Judge Volt (2116–2121)
 Judge Hershey (2122–2131)
 Judge Francisco (2131)
 Judge Sinfield (acting chief judge, 2131–2132) (Usurper)
 Judge Francisco (2132–2134)
 Judge Hershey (2134–2141)
 Judge Logan (2141–incumbent)

Other notable judges
 Judge Joe Dredd
 Former judge Rico Dredd
 Judge Rico
 Judge Anderson
 Judge Buell
 Former judge Galen DeMarco
 Judge Edgar
 Judge Giant Snr
 Judge Giant Jnr
 Judge Grice
 Judge Guthrie
 Judge Janus
 Judge Kraken
 Judge Niles
 Judge Shenker

Dark Judges
 Judge Death
 Judge Fear
 Judge Fire
 Judge Mortis

See also
 List of Judge Dredd characters, which contains details of other Judges.

Notes

References

 Mega-City Judges and Judges of Note from Other Cities at the International Catalogue of Superheroes
 

Judge Dredd characters
Fictional judges
Fictional law enforcement agencies
Fictional titles and ranks